George Cummings (July 28, 1938 in Meridian, Mississippi) is a guitarist and songwriter based in Bayonne, New Jersey and in recent years, Nashville, Tennessee.

The Chocolate Papers
Darryl Vincent and the Flares was formed in Meridian, Mississippi in 1956, and Cummings joined the group in 1959.

In the 1960s, Cummings was a member of the Chocolate Papers, along with Ray Sawyer, Bill Francis, Bobby Dominguez, Popeye Phillips, and Jimmy "Wolf Cub" Allen. The Chocolate Papers toured clubs in Mississippi, Alabama, and South Carolina, before settling in Biloxi as the house band at the popular 800-seat Gus Stevens Restaurant, the first Gulf Coast supper club to offer upscale entertainment with such headliners as Elvis Presley, Andy Griffith, Mel Tormé, Jayne Mansfield, and Mamie Van Doren. The Chocolate Papers moved to Chicago, but Cummings soon decided to form his own band in the New York area.

Dr. Hook & the Medicine Show
Cummings found fame with Dr. Hook & the Medicine Show, the group he named and founded in Union City, New Jersey in 1968. He invited former Chocolate Papers bandmates Ray Sawyer, Billy Francis, and Popeye Phillips to join his new band (Phillips left to join The Flying Burrito Brothers before the band achieved success, and Francis rejoined Cummings shortly after Locorriere joined.) Cummings brought the nineteen-year-old Dennis Locorriere into the band as a bass player. While playing the Bandbox club in Union City, the owner asked George what the name of his band was, and on the spur of the moment, he wrote down "Dr. Hook & the Medicine Show, Straight from the South, serving up Soul Music".

They recorded their debut album for CBS/Columbia in 1970, and sold a million copies of their single, "Sylvia's Mother," when it was re-released in July, 1972.

The group was caricatured on the cover of Rolling Stone.

Cummings sang the bass-register lead vocal on the second verse of "The Cover of the Rolling Stone", as well as playing the comical lead guitar on the instrumental break in concerts (Locorriere actually played it on the recording). He also sang "Makin' It Natural", "Penicillin Penny" (both written by Shel Silverstein), and "I Got Stoned and I Missed It" (co-written by Cummings with Silverstein).

Collaborations
In 1978, at the Muscle Shoals Sound Studio, he collaborated with the legendary Delta bluesman Big Joe Williams on one of the singer's last albums, The Final Years: Big Joe Williams. Co-produced by Cummings, Joe B. Stewart, and Ken Hatley, this album was released in 1993 by Gitanes Jazz/Verve.

In 2003, Cummings worked with Ken Hatley on the soundtrack for Florida City, a film drama about advance knowledge of the Pearl Harbor attack.

In the spring of 2004, the Flares were reborn in Lebanon, Tennessee when Cummings joined original members Jim Pasquale (guitar) and Norman "Knobby" Lowell (drums), along with Nashville singer-songwriters Scotty Cothran, Harold Hutchcraft, Jack Bond, and Forest Borders, to cut the comeback album, It Is What It Is.

In September 2005, Cummings began recording a solo CD, working with Pasquale and Hutchcraft.

References

External links
Online chat with George Cummings (28 July 2001)
Reverbnation.com

1938 births
American rock guitarists
American male guitarists
American rock songwriters
American rock singers
American male singer-songwriters
Musicians from Meridian, Mississippi
Living people
Singer-songwriters from Mississippi
Blues musicians from Mississippi
Dr. Hook & the Medicine Show members
People from Nashville, Tennessee
Musicians from Bayonne, New Jersey
Singer-songwriters from New Jersey
Singer-songwriters from Tennessee
Guitarists from Mississippi
Guitarists from Tennessee
Guitarists from New Jersey
20th-century American guitarists
20th-century American male musicians
Singer-songwriters from New York (state)